Bexleyheath was a parliamentary constituency in south-east London, which returned one Member of Parliament (MP)  to the House of Commons of the Parliament of the United Kingdom.

It was created for the February 1974 general election, and abolished for the 1997 general election.

History
This safe Conservative seat was represented for its entire existence by Sir Cyril Townsend.

Boundaries
1974–1983: The London Borough of Bexley wards of Brampton, Christchurch, Danson, East Wickham, Falconwood, St Michael's, and Upton.

1983–1997: The London Borough of Bexley wards of Barnehurst, Barnehurst North, Brampton, Christchurch, Danson, East Wickham, Falconwood, St Michael's, and Upton.

This constituency in the London Borough of Bexley was centred on the district of Bexleyheath. It was split in 1997 when the Boundary Commission for England recommended an extra seat for the paired boroughs of Bexley and Greenwich. It was largely replaced by the new constituency of Bexleyheath and Crayford, with about a third of the constituency being added to the existing Old Bexley and Sidcup constituency.

Members of Parliament

Election results

Elections in the 1970s

Elections in the 1980s

Elections in the 1990s

See also
List of parliamentary constituencies in London

Notes and references

Parliamentary constituencies in London (historic)
Constituencies of the Parliament of the United Kingdom established in 1974
Constituencies of the Parliament of the United Kingdom disestablished in 1997
Bexleyheath